Phyllonorycter rubicola is a moth of the family Gracillariidae. It is known from the Nepal.

The wingspan is about 6 mm.

The larvae feed on Rubus paniculatus. They mine the leaves of their host plant. The mine has the form of a rather large, irregularly star-like mine occurring upon the upper surface of the leaf. The upper epidermis of the leaf on the mining part is brownish and somewhat orbicularly swollen in the centre where pupation takes place.

References

rubicola
Moths of Asia
Moths described in 1973